Walid Abbas Murad Yousuf Al-Balushi (born 11 June 1985) is an Emirati professional association football player who plays for Shabab Al-Ahli.

International career
Abbas has played for the United Arab Emirates national team since 2008 and represented the Emirates at the 2011, 2015 and 2019 AFC Asian Cups. At the 2011 tournament, he scored two own goals in two matches against Iran and Iraq.

International goals
Scores and results list the UAE's goal tally first.

References

External links
 
 

1985 births
Living people
Emirati footballers
2011 AFC Asian Cup players
2015 AFC Asian Cup players
2019 AFC Asian Cup players
United Arab Emirates international footballers
Al Shabab Al Arabi Club Dubai players
Al Ahli Club (Dubai) players
Shabab Al-Ahli Club players
Association football defenders
UAE Pro League players
Emirati people of Baloch descent
Footballers at the 2006 Asian Games
Asian Games competitors for the United Arab Emirates
FIFA Century Club